Yang Sen (1884–1977) was a Chinese warlord and general.

Yang Sen may also refer to:
Yang Sen (baseball) (born 1981), Taiwanese baseball player
Yeung Sum (born 1947), also Yang Sen in pinyin, Hong Kong politician
Victor Sen Yung (1915–1980), American character actor
Yang Sen (athlete), Chinese gold medal winner at the 2008 Summer Paralympics
Yang Sen (Investiture of the Gods), Investiture of the Gods character